Claire Jane Carmalt is a British chemist who is a Professor of Inorganic Chemistry and Head of the Department of Chemistry at University College London. Her research considers the synthesis of molecular precursors and the development of thin film deposition techniques.

Early life and education 
Carmalt studied chemistry at Newcastle University. She graduated with first class honours in 1992 before starting her doctoral research with Nick Norman. Her research considered the heavy elements of the Boron group and Pnictogen group. After earning her doctorate she spent two years as a postdoc at the University of Texas at Austin where she worked alongside Alan Cowley. She focussed on the design and synthesis of precursors to allow thin film growth.

Research and career 
Carmalt was made a Royal Society Dorothy Hodgkin Research Fellow at University College London in 1997. She has held many positions at UCL, including lecturer, professor, vice dean and eventually Head of Department. When she was made Head of Department in 2016 she was the first woman to hold the position.

Carnalt specialises in the synthesis of highly volatile, non-toxic molecular precursors for the growth of thin films of transparent conducting oxides (TCOs). TCOs are used in a range of different technologies, including computers, mobile phones and photovoltaic devices. The materials most commonly used to make TCOs (indium and tin) are available in limited quantities, expensive and complicated to process. Carmalt is interested in thin film deposition techniques, including chemical vapour deposition, aerosol-assisted chemical vapour deposition (AACVD) and atomic layer deposition. In particular, AACVD offers the potential for large-area TCO coatings based on nanoparticle dispersions.

Awards and honours 
 2000 Royal Society of Chemistry Meldola Medal and Prize
 2018 Ramsay Trustee of the Society of Chemical Industry 
 2019 Royal Society of Chemistry Applied Inorganic Chemistry Award

Selected publications

Personal life 
Carmalt has two daughters.

References 

Living people
Year of birth missing (living people)
British women chemists
British chemists
Alumni of Newcastle University
Academics of University College London
University of Texas at Austin alumni
Inorganic chemists